is a trilogy of Japanese horror/fantasy films written by Tetsuro Yoshida and released in the late 1960s. The films were produced by Daiei Film.

There were originally three movies made:
 Yokai Monsters: 100 Monsters (March 1968)
 Yokai Monsters: Spook Warfare (December 1968)
 Yokai Monsters: Along with Ghosts (March 1969)

While not canonically linked, all three were thematically joined by their inclusion of a group of creatures from Japanese mythology known as yōkai (妖怪, lit. "strange things").

Influence and legacy
Receiving little attention outside Japan, the films are remembered mainly for their special effects, which include a lot of puppetry, suitmation, and even traditional animation. The films made use of yōkai ("strange apparition"), based on traditional illustrations from Japanese folklore. The puppet used for the Kasa-obake in particular has become a recognizable rendering of the creature.

Reboot series 
In 2005, Takashi Miike directed a remake of Yokai Monsters: Spook Warfare titled The Great Yokai War. The film is not officially related to the Yokai Monsters trilogy, but draws a lot of its influence from similar sources, notably the legend of Momotarō and Shigeru Mizuki's GeGeGe no Kitarō series of the same name. Mizuki himself appears in this version, though neither the remake nor the original films make use of his yōkai creations, preferring instead to feature more traditional creatures.

A sequel to The Great Yokai War, titled The Great Yokai War: Guardians, was released in Japan on August 13, 2021.

See also
 Gamera
 Daimajin

References

External links 
One Hundred Monsters at Allmovie.com
Spook Warfare at Allmovie.com
Along With Ghosts at Allmovie.com
Yokai Monsters: One Hundred Monsters at the Internet Movie Database
Yokai Monsters: Spook Warfare at the Internet Movie Database
Yokai Monsters: Along With Ghosts at the Internet Movie Database

1960s monster movies
Film series introduced in 1968
Films based on Japanese myths and legends
Mass media franchises
Kadokawa Dwango franchises
Yōkai in popular culture
1968 horror films
1968 films
1969 horror films
1969 films
Trilogies
Works about yōkai
1960s Japanese films